The Southern Forestry Conclave is an annual competition among students from 15 southern forestry schools in a variety of physical and technical events.   It typically involves more than 250 contestants. Traditional physical events include archery, axe throwing, pole climbing, log rolling, bow sawing, log birling, and cross-cut saw competition.  Technical events include dendrology, timber volume estimation, photogrammetry, wood identification, and others.  Scores from individual events are combined to determine the overall winning school of each year's conclave, which is a highly sought honor.  The Forestry Conclave is hosted by the participating schools on a rotating basis and is sponsored by the Association of Southern Forestry Clubs.

The Conclave promotes spirited competition among the forestry students representing their respective schools and clubs, and participation in the Conclave helps students develop high standards and professionalism.  Planning the Conclave requires considerable cooperation among the participating forestry clubs for it to be successful.

History
Eight forestry schools participated in the first Conclave in 1958, which was sponsored by the University of Georgia.  Fewer than 100 students competed in the first Conclave's mainly physical events.  Over 50 Conclaves have been conducted since the first one.

Host schools

1958 University of Georgia
1959 Louisiana State University
1960 Auburn University
1961 University of Florida
1962 University of Arkansas at Monticello
1963 Clemson University
1964 Oklahoma State University
1965 North Carolina State University
1966 Stephen F. Austin State University
1967 University of Georgia
1968 Clemson University
1969 Auburn University
1970 Virginia Tech
1971 University of Arkansas at Monticello
1972 Oklahoma State University
1973 University of Florida
1974 North Carolina State University
1975 Mississippi State University
1976 University of Georgia
1977 Stephen F. Austin State University
1978 Clemson University
1979 University of Arkansas at Monticello
1980 Virginia Tech
1981 University of Tennessee at Knoxville
1982 Oklahoma State University
1983 University of Florida
1984 Louisiana State University
1985 University of Georgia
1986 Texas A&M University
1987 North Carolina State University
1988 Auburn University
1989 Clemson University
1990 Mississippi State University
1991 Virginia Tech
1992 Louisiana Tech University
1993 University of Tennessee at Knoxville
1994 Stephen F. Austin State University
1995 University of Florida
1996 University of Arkansas at Monticello
1997 University of Georgia
1998 Virginia Tech
1999 North Carolina State University
2000 Louisiana State University
2001 Auburn University
2002 Texas A&M University
2003 Clemson University
2004 Mississippi State University
2005 Stephen F. Austin University
2006 Louisiana Tech University
2007 University of Tennessee at Knoxville
2008 University of Florida
2009 Alabama A&M University
2010 University of Arkansas at Monticello
2011 University of Georgia
2012 North Carolina State University
2013 Auburn University
2014 Virginia Tech
2015 Mississippi State University
2016 Clemson University
2017 Stephen F. Austin University
2018 Abraham Baldwin Agricultural College
2019 Louisiana State University
2020 Postponed due to pandemic
2021 Postponed due to pandemic
2022 University of Tennessee
2023 Louisiana Tech University
2024 University of Florida
2025 Alabama A&M University
2026 University of Arkansas at Monticello
2027 University of Georgia
2028 North Carolina State University
2029 Auburn University
2030 Virginia Tech
2031 Mississippi State University
2032 Clemson University
2033 Stephen F. Austin State University
2034 Abraham Baldwin Agricultural College
2035 Louisiana State University
2036 University of Tennessee
2037 Louisiana Tech University

Sources

Forestry in the United States
Lumberjack sports
College sports in the United States
Forestry events